Mangonui County, formerly Mongonui County, was one of the counties of New Zealand on the North Island. In 1989 it became part of the Far North District Council when amalgamated with the Whangaroa, Hokianga and Bay Of Islands counties, and the Kaitaia and Kaikohe boroughs.

History 
The County was formed in 1876, when the Auckland Provincial Council was abolished. Most of its work was concerned with roads, but it also built wharves and housing. Whangaroa County was formed in 1886 from Mangonui's former Whangaroa Riding. The County office was then based at Mangōnui, until it moved to Kaitaia in 1918. In 1923 the County accepted a £3,800 tender for new offices. On Monday 17 March 1924 new chambers were opened on the Redan Road/Commerce St corner in Kaitaia. The Kaitaia Town Board became a unit within the Council in 1922 and was independent from 1925. However, it (by then Kaitaia Borough Council) and the County shared a town and county clerk from 1977 until abolition in 1989. The Dalmatian Cultural Club now occupies the old Council office, which was given Historic Place Category 2 protection, as List Number 3892, on 6 September 1984.

See also 
 List of former territorial authorities in New Zealand § Counties

References

External links 

 1905 map
 1927 photo of Council Chambers
 Mangonui County 1877 - 1977

Counties of New Zealand
Politics of the Northland Region